Frederik Christian Raben (23 March 1769 – 6 July 1838) was a Danish count, traveller and amateur naturalist. He owned Aalholm Castle on Lolland as well as the Lindencrone Mansion in Copenhagen.

Early life
Frederik Christian Raben was born at Aalholm Castle in 1769 as the son of Otto Ludvig Raben, 2nd Count of Christiansholm. He graduated in law from the University of Copenhagen in 1788 and inherited the family estate when he was 21 years old.

Travels 
F. C. Raben was the owner of the estate Christiansholm (now "Ålholm") on Lolland and amateur botanist. He travelled in Europe and, unusual for his time, to Greenland  and Brazil (1835-1838). He collected many plant specimens during his journey to Brazil. More than 1100 of his herbarium specimens now belong to the Botanical Museum at the University of Copenhagen.

Raben's great auk 
Raben brought a specimen of the now extinct great auk back from Iceland in 1821. In 1968, a descendant of his, Baron Raben-Levetzau to Ålholm, put it on auction at Sotheby's in London. The highest bid - £ 9,000 - was given by Finnur Gudmunsson, then director of the Icelandic Natural History Museum. This is the highest price ever paid for a zoological specimen.

Legacy 
A number of plant species have been named in his honour, particularly based on his own Brazilian collections, e.g. Miconia rabenii (Melastomaceae), Eleocharis rabenii (Cyperaceae) and Campomanesia rabeniana (Myrtaceae).

References 

1769 births
1838 deaths
19th-century Danish botanists
Botanists active in the Arctic
18th-century Danish nobility
19th-century Danish nobility
Raben family
18th-century Danish botanists